The Samborombón River (Spanish, Río Samborombón, literally "Saint Brendan River") is a river of Argentina. It empties into Samborombón Bay in the southern part of the Río de la Plata.

See also
List of rivers of Argentina

References

 Rand McNally, The New International Atlas, 1993.

External links 

La Plata basin
Rivers of Buenos Aires Province
Rivers of Argentina